The 2018 Chennai Open Challenger was a professional tennis tournament played on hard courts. It was the first edition of the tournament which was part of the 2018 ATP Challenger Tour. It took place in Chennai, India between 12 and 17 February 2018.

Singles main-draw entrants

Seeds

 1 Rankings are as of 5 February 2018.

Other entrants
The following players received wildcards into the singles main draw:
  Vijay Sundar Prashanth
  Nitin Kumar Sinha
  Dhakshineswar Suresh
  Manish Sureshkumar

The following player received entry into the singles main draw using a protected ranking:
  Saketh Myneni

The following players received entry from the qualifying draw:
  Arjun Kadhe
  Sidharth Rawat
  Abhinav Sanjeev Shanmugam
  Wishaya Trongcharoenchaikul

Champions

Singles

 Jordan Thompson def.  Yuki Bhambri 7–5, 3–6, 7–5.

Doubles

 Sriram Balaji /  Vishnu Vardhan def.  Cem İlkel /  Danilo Petrović 7–6(7–5), 5–7, [10–5].

References

2018 ATP Challenger Tour
2018 in Indian tennis
2018 in Tamil Nadu
February 2018 sports events in India